Abalak is a rural locality (a selo) and the administrative center of Abalkskoye Rural Settlement of Tobolsky District, Tyumen Oblast, Russia. The population was 806 as of 2010. There are 20 streets.

Geography 
Preobrazhenka is the nearest rural locality.

References

External links 

Rural localities in Tyumen Oblast